Fedor Malykhin (Russian: Фёдор Малыхин; born 13 November 1990) is a Russian professional ice hockey forward who is currently playing for Avangard Omsk of the Kontinental Hockey League (KHL).

Playing career
After five seasons with Ak Bars Kazan, helping claim the Gagarin Cup in 2018, Malykhin left as a free agent to sign a one-year contract with his third KHL club, Traktor Chelyabinsk, on 1 May 2019.

During the 2019–20 season, Malykhin appeared in 29 games for Traktor, posting 3 goals and 4 points. On 28 December 2019, Malykhin was traded by Chelyabinsk to Spartak Moscow in exchange for future considerations.

On 3 May 2020, having left Spartak as a free agent, Malykhin signed a one-year contract to continue in the KHL with HC Vityaz.

Following two seasons with Vityaz Podolsk, Malykhin continued in the KHL, signing as a free agent in agreeing to a two-year contract with Avangard Omsk on 22 May 2022.

Career statistics

Awards and honours

References

External links

1990 births
Living people
Ak Bars Kazan players
Avtomobilist Yekaterinburg players
JHC Avto players
Russian ice hockey forwards
HC Spartak Moscow players
Traktor Chelyabinsk players
Sportspeople from Yekaterinburg
HC Vityaz players